

Events 
Claudio Monteverdi marries court singer Claudia Cattaneo,
Gregor Aichinger begins a two-year sojourn in Rome.

Publications 

Richard Allison – The psalmes of David in meter
Giovanni Francesco Anerio – First book of madrigals for five voices (Venice: Ricciardo Amadino)
Giammateo Asola
 (New Vespers psalms for all solemnities) for six voices (Venice: Ricciardo Amadino)
 for three voices (Venice: Ricciardo Amadino)
Adriano Banchieri –  for eight voices (Venice: Ricciardo Amadino)
Lodovico Bellanda –  for two, three, and four voices (Verona: Francesco Dalle Donne & Scipione Vargnano)
Giulio Belli – First book of masses for four voices (Venice: Angelo Gardano)
John Bennet – Madrigalls to Foure Voyces
Valerio Bona – Fourth book of canzonettas for three voices (Milan: Simon Tini & Francesco Besozzi)
Joachim a Burck –  (Forty catechetical odes in praise of God for use by pious youth) for four voices (Mühlhausen: Hieronymous Reinhard), texts by Ludwig Helmbold
Giovanni Paolo Cima – First book of motets for four voices (Milan: Agostino Tradate)
Giovanni Croce – Masses for five and six voices (Venice: Giacomo Vincenti)
Baldassare Donato – First book of motets for five, six, and eight voices (Venice: Angelo Gardano)
Johannes Eccard –  for six voices (Königsberg, Georg Osterberger), a wedding song
Thomas Elsbeth
 (Exceptional New Secular Songs) for five voices (Frankfurt an der Oder: Friedrich Hartmann)
 (New Spiritual Songs that Evoke Christian Devotion) for five voices (Frankfurt an der Oder: Friedrich Hartmann)
John Farmer – The First Set Of English Madrigals: To Foure Voices (London: William Barley for Thomas Morley)
Ruggiero Giovannelli – Third book of madrigals for five voices (Venice: Giacomo Vincenti)
Hans Leo Hassler – Masses for four, five, six, and eight voices (Nuremberg: Paul Kauffman)
Anthony Holborne – Pavans, Galliards, Almains and other short Aeirs, both grave and light, in five parts, for Viols, Violins, or other Musicall Winde Instruments (London: William Barley)
Giovanni de Macque – Fourth book of madrigals for five voices (Naples: Giovanni Giacomo Carlino & Antonio Pace)
Luca Marenzio – Ninth book of madrigals for five voices (Venice: Angelo Gardano)
Tiburtio Massaino
Fourth book of motets for five voices (Venice: Ricciardo Amadino)
 for five voices (Venice: Ricciardo Amadino), music for Holy Week
Simone Molinaro
First book of madrigals for five voices (Milan: Simon Tini & Francesco Besozzi)
Philippe de Monte –  for seven voices (Venice: Angelo Gardano), a collection of canzoni and madrigals
Giovanni Bernardino Nanino – Second book of madrigals for five voices (Venice: heirs of Girolamo Scotto)
Asprilio Pacelli –  (Rome: Nicolo Mutii)
Giovanni Pierluigi da Palestrina (posthumous publications)
Eighth book of masses
Ninth book of masses
Tomaso Pecci – Canzonettas for three voices (Venice: Giacomo Vincenti), contains fifteen pieces by Pecci and fifteen by Mariano Tantucci
Hieronymus Praetorius –  for five, six, seven, and eight voices (Hamburg: Philip von Ohr)
Enrico Antonio Radesca – Thesoro amoroso, first book of canzonettas for three and four voices (Milan: Simon Tini & Francesco Besozzi)

Sacred music 
Philipp Nicolai
"Wachet auf, ruft uns die Stimme"
"Wie schön leuchtet der Morgenstern"

Opera 
None recorded

Births 
March 23 – Thomas Selle, composer (died 1663)
October 10 – Étienne Moulinié, composer (died 1676)

Deaths 
January 22 – Cristofano Malvezzi, organist and composer (born 1547)
August 22 – Luca Marenzio, Italian composer (born c.1553)
October 16 – Jacob Regnart, Franco-Flemish composer (born c.1540)
November 8 – Francisco Guerrero, composer (born 1528)

References

 
Music
16th century in music
Music by year